Marco Rodrigo Rojas (born 5 November 1991) is a New Zealand professional footballer who plays as a forward for Chilean side Colo-Colo and the New Zealand national team.
During his time in the A-League with Melbourne Victory, Rojas was dubbed the Kiwi Messi by fans for his ability on the ball and goalscoring prowess.

Early life
Rojas attended Aberdeen Primary School and Maeroa Intermediate School during the late 1990s and early-mid-2000s. He is of Chilean descent.

Club career

Wellington Phoenix
Marco Rojas came through Wynton Rufer's Wynrs football academy. He trialled with fellow graduate Caleb Rufer at German clubs Werder Bremen, Hannover and Borussia Mönchengladbach. Neither player was successful, but  Rojas was awarded a trial with the Wellington Phoenix after winning the Retro Ricki Youth Scholarship from the supporters group Yellow Fever. Rojas impressed Wellington coach Ricki Herbert and put in some good performances in the Phoenix's warm up friendlies, resulting in him getting offered a 2-year contract with the A-League side.

On 13 September 2009, he made his senior debut in the A-League for the Wellington Phoenix against Melbourne Victory at the age of 17, coming off the bench as a 77th minute substitution for Daniel making him the second youngest player to play for the Phoenix behind Kosta Barbarouses. Rojas got his second appearance for the Phoenix when he was substituted on for Paul Ifill in the 73rd minute against Central Coast Mariners on 27 September 2009.

Rojas scored his first goal on his full debut for the Phoenix on 18 December 2010 in a 4–0 victory over the Newcastle Jets. His second goal was in the 72nd minute on 5 January against Melbourne Victory helping them secure a 2–0 win at Westpac Stadium. Rojas provided the assist for Chris Greenacre's opening goal in a 3–1 win over North Queensland Fury in the Phoenix's final home game of the 2010–11 season.

On 18 February 2011, Rojas was awarded the NAB Young Player of the Month. On 22 February 2011, he was awarded the Wellington Phoenix young player of the year.

On 27 February 2011, Wellington Phoenix announced that Rojas declined to sign a new contract with the club and wanted to move on. Following this announcement, some media outlets claimed unofficially that Rojas had signed for Melbourne Victory, however, officially, Melbourne coach Ernie Merrick denied this. It was believed at the time that Melbourne Victory, Adelaide United and a South American club were vying for the signature of the highly rated youngster.

Melbourne Victory

On 11 March 2011, Melbourne Victory ended weeks of speculation by officially confirming that they had indeed signed Rojas, securing him on a two-year deal.

On 8 October 2011, Rojas made his debut for Melbourne Victory FC in the A-League season opener against Sydney FC. It would not be until the following 2012–13 season, however, that he would score his first Melbourne Victory goal; it came in the Victory's 2–1 loss to crosstown rivals Melbourne Heart, after receiving a cross from Archie Thompson. His second Melbourne Victory goal came in the Victory's 2–1 win against Adelaide United two weeks later. Rojas scored goal number 15 for season 2012–13 on 31 March 2013 against Wellington Phoenix in a 2–3 win.

At the A-League end of season awards for the 2012–13 season, Rojas won both the Johnny Warren Medal and the A-League Young Footballer of the Year awards.

On 18 April 2013, Rojas quit Melbourne Victory to pursue a career in Europe. His contract with Melbourne expired on 30 April 2013.

VfB Stuttgart

Rojas moved during the 2013–14 season to VfB Stuttgart. On 8 May 2013, Marco Rojas signed a contract until June 2017 with VfB Stuttgart. He joined the Bundesliga side on a free transfer from Melbourne Victory.

On 10 July 2013, Marco started his first game for Die Schwaben in a pre-season friendly match against the local Hohenlohe-Selection at the Schönebürgstadion, Crailsheim. Marco scored his first goal for his new club in this game to give VfB a 4–0 lead just before half time, VfB went on to win the match 5–0.

On 17 July 2013, Marco suffered an injury setback during training that sidelined the Kiwi international for between four and six weeks. Media sources revealed Rojas had broken a bone in his foot. Rojas however continued to swim, cycle and perform weight training but he was unable to continue football related activities until after the new 1. Bundesliga season began in early August.

Loan to SpVgg Greuther Fürth
On 21 August 2014, Rojas was loaned out to SpVgg Greuther Fürth. In January 2015 the loan deal was terminated.

Loan to FC Thun
He was loaned out to FC Thun on 3 January 2015 until the end of the 2014–15 season. On 8 February 2015, Rojas scored his first Swiss Super League goal on debut for FC Thun in Thun's 1–1 draw with FC Aarau match. On 12 June 2015, the loan deal was extended until the end of the 2015–16 season.

Return to Melbourne Victory
On 25 August 2016, Rojas returned to the A-League with former club Melbourne Victory, signing a two-year deal. His first goal on return was the sole goal for Victory in a disappointing Melbourne Derby clash. The following week, Rojas scored a match-winner at the last minute of stoppage time against Adelaide United. His performances in the first half of the season, have been voted by Mark Bosnich as the best the A-League has ever seen.

SC Heerenveen
In July 2017, Rojas joined Dutch club SC Heerenveen on a two-year contract with the option of a third year.

SønderjyskE
SønderjyskE confirmed the signing of Rojas on 22 January 2019. He signed a one-year contract with an option to extend it further, and got shirt number 17. However, his contract wasn't extended and he left the club by the end of 2019.

Second return to Melbourne Victory 
On 22 January 2020, Melbourne Victory announced that he had again signed for the club on a two-and-a-half year deal.

Colo-Colo 
In July 2022, Rojas moved to Chile, the native country of his father, and joined Colo-Colo on a deal for eighteen months.

International career
On 8 March 2011, Rojas was called up for the 30-man squad for the upcoming games against China and Japan for New Zealand's national team the All Whites.
He made his debut as a second-half substitute in the 1–1 draw with China on 25 March 2011 before he made any appearance for any other junior New Zealand sides. The scheduled match against Japan was called off due to logistics and safety concerns following the 2011 Tōhoku earthquake and tsunami. He gained his second international cap against Australia, 5 May 2011 he came on as a second-half substitute. Australia won the game 5–0

Rojas was selected for the New Zealand U-20 team to compete in the 2011 OFC U-20 Championship in April 2011 and the Suwon Cup in Korea. During the OFC U-20 championship he played in all four matches helping the Junior All Whites win the tournament and secure qualification to the 2011 FIFA U-20 World Cup.

During the junior All Whites game against Uruguay in the 2011 under-20 World Cup, Rojas contributed to the goal that put New Zealand in the lead at 54 minutes (the game finished in a 1–1 draw).

He was an unused squad player at the 2012 Summer Olympics.

Career statistics

Club

International

International goals

Honours
Melbourne Victory
FFA Cup: 2021
New Zealand
 OFC Nations Cup: 2016
 OFC U-20 Championship: 2011
Individual
 Oceania Footballer of the Year: 2012
 Johnny Warren Medal: 2012–13
 A-League Young Footballer of the Year: 2012–13
 A-League PFA Team of the Season : 2012–13
 IFFHS OFC Men's Team of the Decade 2011–2020
IFFHS Oceania Men's Team of All Time: 2021

References

External links
 
 
 Marco Rojas Interview

1991 births
Living people
New Zealand people of Chilean descent
Sportspeople from Hamilton, New Zealand
Sportspeople of Chilean descent
New Zealand association footballers
Association football midfielders
Association football wingers
Hamilton Wanderers players
Waikato FC players
Wellington Phoenix FC players
Melbourne Victory FC players
VfB Stuttgart players
VfB Stuttgart II players
SpVgg Greuther Fürth players
SpVgg Greuther Fürth II players
FC Thun players
SC Heerenveen players
SønderjyskE Fodbold players
Colo-Colo footballers
New Zealand Football Championship players
A-League Men players
3. Liga players
2. Bundesliga players
Regionalliga players
Swiss Super League players
Eredivisie players
Danish Superliga players
Chilean Primera División players
New Zealand under-20 international footballers
New Zealand under-23 international footballers
Olympic association footballers of New Zealand
New Zealand international footballers
2012 OFC Nations Cup players
Footballers at the 2012 Summer Olympics
2016 OFC Nations Cup players
2017 FIFA Confederations Cup players
New Zealand expatriate association footballers
Expatriate soccer players in Australia
Expatriate footballers in Germany
Expatriate footballers in Switzerland
Expatriate footballers in the Netherlands
Expatriate men's footballers in Denmark
Expatriate footballers in Chile
New Zealand expatriate sportspeople in Australia
New Zealand expatriate sportspeople in Germany
New Zealand expatriate sportspeople in Switzerland
New Zealand expatriate sportspeople in the Netherlands
New Zealand expatriate sportspeople in Denmark
New Zealand expatriate sportspeople in Chile
Marquee players (A-League Men)